Izvor is a village in the municipality of Čaška, North Macedonia. It was previously the seat of the Izvor Municipality.

Demographics 
According to the national census of 2021, the village had a total of 312 inhabitants. Ethnic groups in the municipality include:

Macedonians 281
Albanians 2
Serbs 1
Persons for whom data are taken from administrative sources 28

References

Villages in Čaška Municipality